The following notable people were born in, residents of, or otherwise closely associated with the city of Long Beach, California.

Sports people
Greta Andersen: 1948 Olympic swimming gold medalist, and long-distance swimmer, originally from Denmark
Quinton Bell: National Football League player
Milton Bradley: baseball player
Tiny Broadwick: pioneering female parachutist
Lynne Cox: long-distance open-water swimmer and writer
J. P. Crawford: Major League Baseball player
Travis d'Arnaud: Major League Baseball player
Walt Faulkner: race car driver
Lisa Fernandez: three-time Olympic softball gold medalist
Landry Fields: former National Basketball Association (NBA) player and currently the general manager of the Atlanta Hawks
Bobby Grich: baseball player
Chris Gwynn: baseball player
Tony Gwynn: Hall of Fame baseball player
Jason Kapono: basketball player
Terry Kennedy: skateboarder
Billie Jean King: tennis Grand Slam winner
Doug Krikorian: sportswriter
Bob Lemon: baseball player and manager, Baseball Hall of Fame inductee
Ed Lytle: baseball player
Joe Maddon: Major League Baseball manager
McKayla Maroney: artistic gymnast
Misty May-Treanor: professional beach volleyball player, Olympic gold medalist
James McDonald: baseball player
Willie McGinest: football player, three-time Super Bowl champion
Tommy Nance: Major league baseball pitcher
Matt Nieto: ice hockey player
Marquez Pope: National Football League figure
Beans Reardon: baseball umpire
Matt Treanor: baseball player
Chase Utley: baseball player
Carl Weathers: football player and actor
Christian Wood: basketball player
Russell Westbrook: basketball player
Antoine Cason: football player

Entertainment
Adrian Young: musician, songwriter and drummer
Brooks Wackerman: musician, songwriter and drummer
Millicent Borges Accardi: writer, National Endowment for the Arts award for poetry
Fatty Arbuckle: actor
Richard Bach: author of Jonathan Livingston Seagull
Bad Azz: hip hop artist
Theda Bara: actress
Frank Black (aka Black Francis): leader of the Pixies rock group
Jan Burke: mystery author, 2000 Edgar Award for Best Novel (for Bones)
Dan Castellaneta: actor and voice actor
Mary Castle: actress 
George Chakiris: Academy Award-winning actor
Nat King Cole: singer and jazz piano player
Scout Taylor-Compton, actress 
Jonathan Davis: lead singer for KoЯn
Tray Deee: rapper from the Eastsidaz
The Dove Shack (consisting of rappers C-Knight, Bo-Roc and 2Scoops): G-funk/hip hop group
Cameron Diaz: actress
Don Dixon: astronomical artist
Domino: rapper
Melissa Etheridge: rock singer
Goldie Loc: rapper from the Eastsidaz
half•alive (consisting of musicians Josh Taylor, Brett Kramer, and J. Tyler Johnson): indie pop band
Ricky Harris, actor and producer
Donna Hilbert: poet
James Hilton: author, wrote 1937 novel Lost Horizon
John Lee Hooker: blues singer
Jared Hornbeek bassist/musician from Alternative Rock band The Unlikely Candidates
Marilyn Horne: opera singer
Thelma Houston: R&B singer
Gabriel Iglesias: stand-up comedian
Robert Irwin: artist
Sally Kellerman: actress
DeForest Kelley: Star Trek actor
Vicki Lawrence: comedian and actress
Camryn Manheim: actress
Wendi McLendon-Covey: actress
Robert Mitchum: actor
Ericson Alexander Molano: gospel singer
Manny Montana: actor
Frances O'Connor: sideshow performer, without arms
Ikey Owens: keyboardist of The Mars Volta
Paulina Peavy: artist, inventor, painter, designer, sculptor, poet, writer, and lecturer.
Jenni Rivera: singer, television personality
Upton Sinclair: author
 Michael Stuhlbarg: actor
Dylan and Cole Sprouse: teen actors, The Suite Life on Deck
Frank Ocean: American singer, songwriter, and rapper.
Vince Staples: rapper
Norma Tanega: folksinger-songwriter 
Mike Vallely: skateboarder, musician Black Flag
Maitland Ward: actress
Snoop Dogg: rapper
Warren G: Rapper
Nate Dogg: Rapper/Singer
Nicolas Cage: Actor
Bo Derek: Actress
Jennette McCurdy: Ex-Child Actress
Bradley Nowell: Lead singer, and guitarist for the band Sublime (band)
Isidora Goreshter: actress
Giveon: singer and songwriter*
Rival Sons: rock band

Other
Elizabeth Milbank Anderson: philanthropist and advocate for public health and women's education; her house is now the Long Beach Museum of Art
Jacqueline Bishop: artist
Dorothy Buffum Chandler: Los Angeles philanthropist (wife of Norman Chandler, publisher of the Los Angeles Times) and namesake of the Dorothy Chandler Pavilion)
Bayless Conley: televangelist 
Douglas "Wrong Way" Corrigan: flew unauthorized "wrong way" flight from New York to Ireland
William John Cox:  public interest attorney, author and political activist
George Deukmejian: Governor of California, 1983–1991
 John Mack Faragher, American historian and author
Albert P. Halfhill: father of tuna packing industry
Edwin J. Hill: Medal of Honor recipient
Jesse James: custom motorcycle and car builder, West Coast Choppers and Monster Garage
Paula Jones: Civil Servant
Long Gone John: entrepreneur, owner and CEO of Sympathy for the Record Industry
Isaac C. Kidd: Medal of Honor recipient
Greg Laurie: televangelist
Richard H. Leigh: four-star admiral
Annabel Parlett McMillin - American First Lady of Guam.
Frank Merriam: Governor of California, 1934–1939
William F. Prisk: California State Senator, editor-publisher of Long Beach Press-Telegram
San Kim Sean - martial artist
Elizabeth Short (aka "The Black Dahlia"): murder victim (Originally from Boston, Massachusetts)
Meredith Thompson: law enforcement special agent

See also
 List of mayors of Long Beach

References

 
Long Beach, California
Long Beach